Juan Riba Guixà (19 January 1900 – 20 April 1973) was a Spanish rower. He competed in the men's eight event at the 1924 Summer Olympics.

References

External links
 

1900 births
1973 deaths
Spanish male rowers
Olympic rowers of Spain
Rowers at the 1924 Summer Olympics
Rowers from Barcelona